Koza Altın İşletmeleri A.Ş is a Turkish gold mining company.

Founded in 1989 as a branch of former Australian Normandy Mining corporation, in 2005 Koza İpek bought all the company's shares.

Gold mines 
In 2006, Koza Altın opened the Küçükdere gold mine near Havran, Marmara Region, with ore being processed in Ovacık.

In Central Anatolia, the Kaymaz gold mine with a third processing center in Sivrihisar, was established in 2011. In a fourth processing center at Himmetdede gold mine near Kocasinan, commercial production of gold has commenced in 2015.

, Koza Altın held 57 operating licenses and 281 exploration licenses all over Turkey. Also, a joint venture with Canadian Medgold Resources conducts explorations for gold and silver in Portugal.

References

Literature

External links
  

Gold mining companies
Mining companies of Turkey
Companies established in 1989
1989 establishments in Turkey
Companies based in Ankara
Companies listed on the Istanbul Stock Exchange